Lee Si-woo (born September 5, 1997) is a South Korean actress and model under Big Picture Entertainment. She is best known for her roles in Sisyphus: The Myth (2021), Be My Boyfriend (2021), Sh**ting Stars (2022) and Money Heist: Korea – Joint Economic Area (2022).

Early life
Lee was born on September 5, 1997 in South Korea.

Career

2018–present: Modelling and acting debut
Lee made her debut as a model under Big Picture Entertainment. She made her acting debut in Sisyphus: The Myth in 2021, playing the role as Bing Bing and Lee Ji-hun. She was cast as the lead in the web series Be My Boyfriend as Oh Ji-na in 2021. She was also cast for the role of Jin Yu-Na in Sh**ting Stars (2021).

Filmography

Television series

Web series

Music video appearances

References

External links
 
 
Lee Si-woo at Instagram

1997 births
Living people
21st-century South Korean actresses
South Korean female models
South Korean television actresses
South Korean television personalities